In mathematics, in the field of functional analysis, the Cotlar–Stein almost orthogonality lemma is named after mathematicians Mischa Cotlar
and Elias Stein. It may be used to obtain information on the operator norm on an operator, acting from one Hilbert space into another
when the operator can be decomposed into almost orthogonal pieces.
The original version of this lemma
(for self-adjoint and mutually commuting operators)
was proved by Mischa Cotlar in 1955 and allowed him to conclude that the Hilbert transform
is a continuous linear operator in 
without using the Fourier transform.
A more general version was proved by Elias Stein.

Cotlar–Stein almost orthogonality lemma
Let  be two Hilbert spaces.
Consider a family of operators
with each 

Denote

 

The family of operators
, 
is almost orthogonal if

The Cotlar–Stein lemma states that if 
are almost orthogonal,
then the series

converges in the strong operator topology,
and that

Proof
If R1, ..., Rn is a finite collection of bounded operators, then

So under the hypotheses of the lemma,

It follows that 

and that

Hence the partial sums 

form a Cauchy sequence. 

The sum is therefore absolutely convergent with limit satisfying the stated inequality.

To prove the inequality above set

with |aij| ≤ 1 chosen so that

Then

Hence

Taking 2mth roots and letting m tend to ∞,

which immediately implies the inequality.

Generalization
There is a generalization of the Cotlar–Stein lemma with sums replaced by integrals. Let X be a locally compact space and μ a Borel measure on X. Let T(x) be a map from X into bounded operators from E to F which is uniformly bounded and continuous in the strong operator topology. If 

are finite, then the function T(x)v is integrable for each v in E with

The result can be proved by replacing sums by integrals in the previous proof or by using Riemann sums to approximate the integrals.

Example
Here is an example of an orthogonal family of operators.  Consider the inifite-dimensional matrices

and also

Then
 for each ,
hence the series 
does not converge in the uniform operator topology.

Yet, since

and 

the Cotlar–Stein almost orthogonality lemma tells us that 

converges in the strong operator topology and is bounded by 1.

Notes

References

Hilbert space
Harmonic analysis
Operator theory
Inequalities
Theorems in functional analysis
Lemmas in analysis